Pather Dabi (The Right of Way; or Demands of the Road) is a Bengali novel written by Sarat Chandra Chattopadhyay. It was first published as a novel in 1926, after having been initially serialized in the journal Bangabani. The book is set in British-occupied India.

Content
The book is about a secret society named Pather Dabi whose goal is to free India from British rule.And Sarat Chandra chattopadhyay played a great role for making a Revolutionary mind in  young Indians,which gives an effort to the Indians to free from this Torture by British.Sharat Chandra chattopadhyay helped to create an independent consciousness among the Indians.And he also mentioned that independence is the only way to save Indians and also mentioned that proper relationship is not only family relations but also a  relation with anyone who is struggling to save India from the British rule, through the words of his novel.The leader of the organization is Sabyasachi Mallick, who is described as being highly educated, having studied medicine, engineering, and law in Europe and America. Sabyasachi is also endowed with physical strength and courage which enable him to elude British intelligence. His physical feats include swimming across a torrential river, and traversing the Eastern Himalayas on foot.

Another major character, Apurba , a member of Pather Dabi, described as a contemptible figure. Emotional and impressionable, Apurba grieves at the colonial rule. He is, however, also weak, timid, and venal. A scene in the book depicts him being humiliated at a railway station by white youth. His obsession with caste purity even during illness and danger is depicted with contempt. Eventually, Apurba becomes a police informer. The main narrative in the book follows Apurba with Sabyasachi appearing unexpectedly, and disappearing as mysteriously.

Sabyasachi does not believe in the caste system, and towards the end of the book pleads for the destruction of "all that is eternal (sanatan), ancient, and decaying--[in] religion, society, tradition" on the ground that these are "enemies of the nation."

Other important characters in the novel are Sumitra and Bharati, who work alongside men in defiance of the traditional social conventions of the day.  Sumitra is described as being beautiful and intelligent, besides being a nationalist. In the book, Sumitra makes an impassioned argument for why it is appropriate for a woman to leave a loveless marriage.

According to a review of the book in the Indian Express:

Characters 
 Apurba is a staunch Hindu but a fearful and feeble youth who hates Britishers. He loves her mother Karunamayi unconditionally but was hated and mocked by his brother and sister- in law. He got a job in Yangon,  Mayanmar, where he met with Bharti, a Hindu Bengali girl who was adopted by a Christian. One day, at the railway station he was thrown out of train by the Britishers. He also met with Savyasanchi or Doctor Sahib, who is a traitor and was influenced by him. Initially, he had a constant conflict with Bharti and her family but after the death of Bharti's parents they come close to each other. With the help of Bharti he become a member of Pather Dabi or Path Ke Davedar, a secret association who works for India's freedom and for the rights of laborers. The association had very harsh rule and they don't forgive who betrays them. Apurba one day, was arrested by Police and he reveals all the secrets about his association. He was arrested by Pather Dabi, but due to Bharti he was released but was boycotted by the association. He then, after some time realized his mistake and become strong. At the end, he sattled to China with Bharti and Doctor. 
 Sabyasanchi or Doctor Sahib was an educated and intelligent person who owned many degrees but was a traitor who worked for freedom of India. He was the important member of Pather Dabi. He was loved by Sumitra, the president of Pather Dabi. He considered Bharti as his sister. He was a good friend of Apurba and was so much respected by him. 
 Bharti was the important member of Pather Dabi. She considered Sumitra her sister and Doctor as her brother. She loves Apurba. She was an extroverted and caring girl. 
 Talvalkar He was a Marathi man who works with Apurba and was a good friend of him. He was married and had daughters. He was in prison. He had a revolutinary mind. He joined Pather Dabi with the help of Apurba.  He started revolt while addressing the people resulting in arresting of him. He was beaten up by police harshly but was later released. 
 Sumitra (original name - Roz Daud) was initially a drug dealer but later become the president of Pather Dabi when she was rescued by Doctor while smuggling. She loved Sabyasanchi secretly. She was a daring and patriot lady.
 Karunamayi was the loving and caring mother of Apurba. She was a staunch Hindu but was never supported by her husband, daughter- in laws and children except Apurba. 
 Vinod was the brother of Apurba

Reception
The first edition of the book, comprising 5,000 copies, was sold out within a week. Subsequent to this, the book was banned on 4 January 1921 by British Government after due consultation of the then Advocate General of West Bengal.
Tanika Sarkar, while analyzing the character of Sabyasachi, has observed:  "Capable, literally of everything, [Sabyasachi] is the first superman in serious Bengali fiction, always a million times larger than life.
It has been suggested that Sabyasachi's usage of various disguises to escape police detection have conspicuous parallels with the modus operandi of Surya Sen.

Sarat Chandra and Tagore
A correspondence between Sarat Chandra and Rabindranath Tagore took place after the ban imposed on the book. Tagore justified the ban on the book, on the ground that it was a seditious book, while Sarat justified his book on the ground that "throughout India, large numbers of people are being imprisoned or externed by the government on flimsy grounds without trial or in flagrant miscarriage of justice." Sarat agreed with Tagore's assessment that the book caused the reader to become disenchanted with the British government, stating that this indeed was his intention in writing it.

Film
The 1977 film Sabyasachi (film), starring Uttam Kumar, is based on this book. The co starrer were Tarun Kumar, Bikash Roy, Supriya Choudhury.

References

Works by Sarat Chandra Chattopadhyay
Bengali-language literature
Indian Bengali-language novels
20th-century Indian novels

See Also 
 Sarat Chandra Chattopadhyay 
 Britisher Raj